Hell's Kitchen is an American reality television cooking competition (based on the British series of the same name) broadcast on Fox and premiered on May 30, 2005. It is hosted by celebrity chef Gordon Ramsay.

On February 1, 2022, the series was renewed for a twenty-first and twenty-second season, with the twenty-first season airing September 2022–February 2023.

Series overview

Episodes

Season 1 (2005)

Season 2 (2006)

Season 3 (2007)

Season 4 (2008)

Season 5 (2009)

Season 6 (2009)

Season 7 (2010)

Season 8 (2010) 

Recaps

Season 9 (2011)

Season 10 (2012)

Season 11 (2013)

Season 12 (2014)

Season 13 (2014)

Season 14 (2015)

Season 15 (2016)

Season 16 (2016–17)

Season 17: All Stars (2017–18)

Season 18: Rookies vs. Veterans (2018–19)

Season 19: Las Vegas (2021)

Season 20: Young Guns (2021)

Season 21: Battle of the Ages (2022–23)

References 

Lists of food television series episodes
Lists of reality television series episodes
Episodes